Satch and Josh...Again is a 1977 album by Oscar Peterson and Count Basie.

Track listing
 "Roots" (Count Basie, Oscar Peterson) - 6:44
 "Your Red Wagon" (Gene DePaul, Richard M. Jones, Don Raye) - 5:37
 "Home Run" (Basie, Peterson) - 2:40
 "Sweethearts on Parade" (Carmen Lombardo, Charles Newman) - 6:37
 "Lil' Darlin'" (Neal Hefti) - 4:28
 "The Time Is Right" (Peterson) - 4:31
 "Cherry" (Don Redman) - 5:50
 "Lester Leaps In" (Lester Young) - 4:49
 "She's Funny That Way" (Neil Moret, Richard Whiting) - 5:38
 "Lady Fitz" (Basie, Peterson) - 4:46

Personnel
Recorded September 22, 1977, Group IV Recording Studios, Hollywood, Los Angeles, California:
 Count Basie - piano, organ
 Oscar Peterson - piano
 Louie Bellson - drums
 John Heard - double bass
 Nat Hentoff  - liner notes
 Val Valentin - engineer
 Norman Granz - producer

References

1978 albums
Count Basie albums
Oscar Peterson albums
Pablo Records albums
Albums produced by Norman Granz